Təzəkənd, Nakhchivan may refer to:
 Təzəkənd, Kangarli
 Təzəkənd, Sharur
 Təzəkənd, Maxta